KDBB (104.3 FM) is a radio station licensed to Bonne Terre, Missouri, United States.  The station is currently owned by Odle Media Group.

References

External links

DBB